Nattawut Suksum (born 6 November 1997) is a Thai professional footballer who plays as a forward for Thai League 1 club PT Prachuap.

References

External links

1997 births
Living people
Nattawut Suksum
Nattawut Suksum
Association football forwards
Nattawut Suksum
J3 League players
Nattawut Suksum
FC Tokyo U-23 players
Expatriate footballers in Japan
Thai expatriate footballers
Thai expatriate sportspeople in Japan